Ancylometis trigonodes is a species of moth in the  family Oecophoridae. It is known from Mauritius.

This species has a wingspan of 11mm for the male. 
Its head is ochreous-yellow, the face whitish-ochreous.
Antennae and thorax are dark-fuscous, the abdomen greyish-ochreous.
Forewings are elongated and rather narrow, the costa moderately arched. They are dark fuscous, very slightly purplish-tinged with a large ochreous-white triangular patch mixed with pale yellow in the middle.
Hindwings are fuscous-grey, becoming paler and semitransparent on the basal half.

References

Moths described in 1887
Oecophoridae
Moths of Mauritius
Endemic fauna of Mauritius